Numenera is a science fantasy tabletop role-playing game set in the far distant future, written by Monte Cook, published in 2013.

Game

Setting 

Numenera is set on Earth approximately one billion years in the future. The setting is called "The Ninth World" due to the fact that eight civilizations have risen and fallen prior to the current era.

Character creation 

Character creation has been simplified by having players fill in the blanks to the statement: 
"I am a __ __ who _s."
 The first blank, the adjective in the sentence, is filled in by a character's "Descriptor", a way to describe the character's strongest characteristic.
 The second blank, the noun of the sentence, is filled in by a character's "Type", which is a "Glaive" (a warrior type), a "Nano" (a technology adept type), or a "Jack" (as in jack-of-all-trades).
 The third blank, the verb of the sentence, is filled in by a character's "Focus", or what the character is most known for or their special talent.

Technology 
The name "Numenera" is a reference to the bits of technology left over from past civilizations. The word "numen" is a Latin root word meaning a "pervading divine presence" and "era" refers to the period (1 billion years in the future) in which this universe takes place. The world is utterly filled with "nanites" (the divine presence) that some beings in this universe can tap into and control. With a nod towards Clarke's Third Law, "any sufficiently advanced technology is indistinguishable from magic", the setting treats technology with much the same approach as magic in a fantasy setting. The native tech level is roughly medieval.

Launch 
Numenera was launched via a Kickstarter campaign, that set a record for "most money raised for a tabletop role-playing game" at $517,255 by 4,658 backers, surpassing the previous record set by the Kickstarter for Traveller 5th edition. Originally intended just to fund the initial core rulebook, the campaign more than doubled its fund goal within the first 24 hours. "Stretch-goals" that were announced as the level of funding grew increased the output of products, ending up producing an entire game line.

Numenera Destiny and Discovery 
This two volume replacement for the original rulebook was crowdfunded in 2017. It increased emphasis on exploration, discovery, and building. It also incorporated a few revisions from the Cypher rule system that had been released subsequent to the original Numenera release. Calling itself Numenera 2, it also used a Kickstarter campaign for initial funding, obtaining $845,258 from 4,185 backers.

Numenera: Discovery is a revision of the original core rulebook. The Jack character type was substantially revised to be more distinctive compared to Nanos and Glaives. Also added are player intrusions, a mechanism allowing players to alter the environment by spending an experience point.

Legacy material from the original Numenera book, not included in the new edition were made available for free as a PDF.

Numenera: Destiny is mostly new material offering three new character types: Arkus, Delve, and Wright, new descriptors and new foci. The book also emphasizes crafting along with community protection and development with these character types taking lead positions in such an endeavor. A major section on crafting mechanisms and a major section on communities are provided. The manner of running a community game can be described as treating the community as an NPC in the game with stats that the player characters enhance. New monsters, NPCs, and settings are also offered in the Destiny core rulebook.

Products 
The core rulebook of Numenera has been translated into Italian, German, Spanish, French and Portuguese.

Numenera Core Rulebooks

Supplements

Adventures and Glimmers 

Glimmers are short, PDF-only publications. There are also some adventure collections that have appeared in print:

Game aids

Fiction

Related products 
There have been several announced tie-ins to the brand:
 Thunderstone Advance: Numenera by AEG, an expansion to the Thunderstone deck-building card game, set in the world of Numenera.
 
 Torment: Tides of Numenera by inXile, a spiritual successor to Planescape: Torment by Interplay. This computer game was also launched by Kickstarter and was itself a record setter for Kickstarter, being the fastest to $1 million up to that time.
 Reaper Miniatures released a boxed set of 28-mm scale miniature figures for Numenera.

Awards 

Numenera received several awards, including the 2014 Origins Award for "Best New Roleplaying Game".

References

External links 

Fantasy role-playing games
Kickstarter-funded tabletop games
Origins Award winners
Role-playing games introduced in 2012
Science fantasy role-playing games
Science fiction role-playing games
Fiction set in the 7th millennium or beyond